Michal Kukučka (born 12 April 2002) is a Slovak footballer who plays for AS Trenčín in the Fortuna Liga as a goalkeeper.

Club career

AS Trenčín
Kukučka made his unexpected Fortuna Liga debut for AS Trenčín, during a home fixture at na Sihoti, against Spartak Trnava on 6 March 2021. He had to step-in to replace Igor Šemrinec, who had recently tested positive for COVID-19. He managed to keep a clean sheet. In this debut, he won himself a nomination in the official Fortuna Liga Team of the Week. In post-match interviews Kukučka highly praised experiences gained during a trial with A.S. Roma of autumn 2020. Kukučka also appeared in the first round of Fortuna Liga - Championship Group at Tehelné pole against Slovan Bratislava the following week, conceding six times during the 6:2 defeat.

References

External links
 AS Trenčín official club profile 
 Futbalnet profile 
 

2002 births
Living people
People from Nové Mesto nad Váhom
Sportspeople from the Trenčín Region
Slovak footballers
Association football goalkeepers
AS Trenčín players
Slovak Super Liga players